Homespun offers music instruction for many instruments and styles on CD, DVD and streaming media.

History
Happy Traum's inspiration for Homespun came in 1967, when he was a musician and part-time guitar teacher in New York City. When he moved to Woodstock, New York and began to tour with his brother Artie Traum, he made tapes (based on his 1965 book Fingerpicking Styles for Guitar) for his guitar students to use when he was unavailable.

He also received letters from others who wanted to learn to play, so he made more tapes and sold them via classified advertisements in Guitar Player, Rolling Stone, and Sing Out! magazines.

He decided to turn this effort into the Homespun business, with his wife Jane as co-owner and his brother Artie assisting. They invited musicians they knew to record instructional tapes. Bill Keith (banjo) and Kenny Kosek (fiddle) were among the first to participate.

Homespun's first instructional lessons were recorded in Traum's home and sold on five-inch reel-to-reel tapes, as cassettes were not yet generally available. The tapes were manually reproduced one by one at home: thus the name "Homespun."

Traum produced the sessions, and provided guidance for artists who were uncomfortable teaching. As the business grew, Traum traveled to other locations to record more musicians, and invited musicians outside their circle of friends to participate.

In 1983, Homespun introduced music instruction on VCR tapes, before most homes had video players. Through the years, Homespun has expanded its audio and video formats, moving from audio cassette and video tape to CDs, DVDs, and streaming media.

The Hal Leonard Corporation has been distributing Homespun products since 1995. Homespun products are also sold at their website, and the Roots music channel offers a web subscription service for Homespun streaming media.

Instructors
The following is a partial list of artists who have provided music instruction on a Homespun release.

A – C

 John Abercrombie
 Eddie Adcock
 Gaye Adegbalola
 Steve Allen
 Darol Anger
 Chet Atkins
 Etta Baker
 Butch Baldassari
 Russ Barenberg
 Ray Benson
 Norman and Nancy Blake
 Rory Block
 Bruce Bouton
 Bob Brozman
 Dix Bruce
 Bryan Bowers
 Kevin Burke
 Sam Bush
 Larry Campbell
 Bob Carlin
 Jack Casady
 Cindy Cashdollar
 Catfish Keith
 Vassar Clements
 David Bennett Cohen
 Dan Crary

D – G

 Rick Danko
 Jack DeJohnette
 Michael Doucet
 Jerry Douglas
 John Doyle
 Casey Driessen
 Steve Earle
 Ramblin' Jack Elliott
 Bill Evans
 Donald Fagen
 Cathy Fink
 Eliot Fisk
 Béla Fleck
 Beppe Gambetta
 Amos Garrett
 Jimmie Dale Gilmore
 Danny Gottlieb
 Richard Greene
 David Grier
 David Grisman
 George Gruhn

H – L

 John Hammond
 Frederic Hand
 Corey Harris
 John Hartford
 Ernie Hawkins
 Levon Helm
 Billy Hinsche
 David Holt
 Aaron Hurwitz ("Professor Louie")
 Rob Ickes
 John Jackson
 John James
 Flaco Jiménez
 Johnnie Johnson
 Buster B. Jones
 Keb' Mo'
 Jorma Kaukonen
 Bill Keith
 Pete Kennedy
 Jim Kweskin
 Andy LaVerne
 Brad Leftwich
 Howard Levy
 Caterina Lichtenberg

M – R

 Mike Marshall
 Steve Martin
 Cathal McConnell
 Ronnie McCoury
 John McCutcheon
 Roger McGuinn
 Jesse McReynolds
 Joey Miskulin
 Bill Monroe
 Geoff Muldaur
 Maria Muldaur
 Tim O'Brien
 Mark O'Connor
 Sonny Osborne
 Gary Peacock
 Al Petteway
 Kelly Joe Phelps
 Dirk Powell
 Mac Rebennack (Dr John)
 Don Wayne Reno
 Del Rey
 Tony Rice
 Jean Ritchie
 Lee Rocker
 Peter Rowan
 Tom Rush

S – Z

 Floyd Scholz
 David Schnaufer
 John Sebastian
 Mike Seeger
 Pete Seeger
 Martin Simpson
 Chris Smither
 Ralph Stanley
 Andy Statman
 Hubert Sumlin
 Bryan Sutton
 Livingston Taylor
 Hans Theessink
 Chris Thile
 Richard Thompson
 David Torn
 Adam Traum
 Artie Traum
 Happy Traum
 Tony Trischka
 Jay Ungar
 Darrin Vincent
 Rob Wasserman
 Doc Watson
 Merle Watson
 Jim Weider
 David Wilcox
 Jim Wood
 Victor Wooten

References

External links
 
 

Music education
Teaching